The Spanish, and later the Mexican, government encouraged settlement of the Territorio de Nuevo Mexico by the establishment of large land grants, many of which were turned into ranchos, devoted to the raising of cattle and sheep.  The owners of these ranchos patterned themselves after the landed gentry in Spain.  Their workers included Native Americans, some of whom had learned to speak Spanish and ride horses.  Of the hundreds of grants, Spain made only a few. The remainder were granted by Mexico after 1821.  The ranchos established land-use patterns that are recognizable in the New Mexico of today.

Land grants were made both to individuals and communities during the Spanish (1598–1821) and Mexican (1821–1846) periods of New Mexico's history.  Nearly all of the Spanish records of land grants that were made in what is now New Mexico prior to the Pueblo Revolt of 1680 were destroyed in the revolt.  Thus, historians can often only be certain of land grants that were made after the Spanish Reconquest of New Mexico in 1693.  "The two major types of land grants were private grants made to individuals, and communal grants made to groups of individuals for the purpose of establishing settlements.  Communal land grants were also made to Pueblos for the lands they inhabited."

Spanish era
During Spanish rule (1769–1821), land grants were typically concessions from the Spanish crown, permitting settlement and granting grazing rights on specific tracts of land, while retaining title.

Notable land grants in New Mexico

 Alameda Land Grant- Situated on the west bank of the Rio Grande and presently a part of Albuquerque and Rio Rancho, the Alameda Land Grant (also the Town of Alameda Grant) was a  parcel of land given by King Philip IV of Spain in 1710 to Francisco Montes Vigil, who later sold the land, which included only some farmland along the Rio Grande, to Captain Juan Gonzales of the Spanish Army.  In 1929,  were purchased by Albert F. Black who established the Seven Bar Ranch. The Black family built an adobe home and in 1947 a small airport which was known as the "Alameda Airport". Surrounded by growing urban areas, the Black family sold off much of the remaining ranch for the development of new residential subdivisions.  The Alameda Airport remained in operation until 1986, when it was closed to make way for 1983 plans for a  mall project.
 Atrisco Land Grant

 Elena Gallegos Land Grant-The Elena Gallegos Land Grant was created in 1694 for Diego Montoya, though settlers may have occupied it even earlier, prior to the Pueblo Revolt. In 1712 the grant, stretching from the crest of the Sandia Mountains to the Rio Grande, was reissued to Elena Gallegos.  Her descendants further subdivided the approximately  plot such that when the land grant was re-adjudicated by American authorities in 1893 it was treated as a communal land grant. Much of northern Albuquerque is built on the former land grant. A large open space preserve is named for the grant.
 San Miguel del Vado Land Grant originally 350,000 acres in the Pecos River valley south of Pecos Pueblo. This land grant was a contributing factor in the demise of the Pecos Pueblo, which deteriorated from one of the leading pueblos to the point of the last families abandoning their land and moving to Jemez Pueblo. Overpopulation pressure and military protection centered at the San Miguel del Vado also contributed to the establishment of other land grants northeast of it, including the Las Vegas Land Grant. 
 Maxwell Land Grant
 Tierra Amarilla Land Grant

United States Era 
For over a century after New Mexico became a part of the United States, the U.S. did not have a process for fully recognizing these grants, though it had been a guarantee under the Treaty of Guadalupe Hidalgo. A notable historical moment is when Reies Tijerina raided the Tierra Amarilla courthouse in 1967, to protest the state of the land grants.

References

External links 
Treaty of Guadalupe Hidalgo, Definition and List of Community Land Grants in New Mexico, September 2001, United States General Accounting Office, accessed 28 October 2009.

Colonial Mexico
Economy of New Mexico
Colonial New Mexico
Spanish-American culture in New Mexico
Land grants